= Keystone Collections Group =

Tax collection company in Pennsylvania

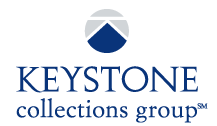
- Product type: Tax Collection Services
- Country: United States
- Introduced: June 3, 2002; 24 years ago
- Website: www.keystonecollects.com

Keystone Collections Group, owned by Kratzenberg & Associates Inc., is a privately held local tax collections company operating primarily out of Irwin, Pennsylvania, and serving 18 out of the 70 local tax jurisdictions in the state of Pennsylvania as of February 1, 2017. It is the second largest local tax collector in the state by number of districts served.

== History ==
Pennsylvania Act 32, which was enacted in 2008 and came into effect on January 1, 2012, established county-wide local income tax collection districts (except for Allegheny County), and requires these districts to delegate collection of these taxes to a third-party agent (except for Philadelphia, which is exempted from the law). This act requires all employers to withhold local income taxes and remit those withholdings to the appropriate local tax collection company for any employee who works within the state of Pennsylvania, whether at an employer-owned worksite or a home workplace. As a result, employees who work out of any of the districts currently served by Keystone Collections Group are legally required to have their local income taxes withheld by their employer and remitted to the company, and are responsible for paying any outstanding amount to Keystone each tax year.

== Districts Served ==
The following is a list of the 18 Pennsylvania local tax districts served by Keystone Collections Group as of February 1, 2017.

Tax District	District PSD Code
Allegheny North Tax Collection District	71
Allegheny Southeast Tax Collection District	72
Bedford Tax Collection District	5
Bucks Tax Collection District	9
Chester Tax Collection District	15
Clarion Tax Collection District	16
Clearfield Tax Collection District	17
Dauphin Tax Collection District	22
Delaware Tax Collection District	23
Greene Tax Collection District	30
Lebanon Tax Collection District	38
Northampton Tax Collection District	48
Northumberland Tax Collection District	49
Tioga Tax Collection District	59
Washington Tax Collection District	63
Fulton Tax Collection District	29
Forest Tax Collection District	27
